Norman Foote Marsh (July 16, 1871 - September 5, 1955) was an American architect based in Los Angeles, California who worked mostly in California and Arizona.

He was born in Upper Alton, Illinois.  He obtained a B.S. degree from the College of Engineering and School of Architecture at
the University of Illinois in 1897. He moved to Los Angeles in 1900.

Among his accomplishments is serving as principal architect for the design and construction of the City of Venice, California in 1906, working for the developer Abbott Kinney.  Venice's design includes canals and a central district along Windward Avenue with the look of an Italian Renaissance street.

He designed more than 20 churches in the Los Angeles area (in Pasadena, Glendale, San Jose, Long Beach) and seven or more churches in
San Diego.  He designed houses in Hollywood and Ojai and elsewhere for prominent persons. He designed dozens of elementary and secondary schools and some University buildings in Arizona and California.

He was a partner in Marsh, Smith & Powell, along with partner Herbert Powell.

A number of his works are listed on the National Register of Historic Places.

Works by Marsh or the firm include:
a hotel in Hollywood in 1907
a public library in Azusa in 1909
the primary building of the first exclusive campus of Mesa Union High School (1909) in Mesa, Arizona, destroyed by accidental fire in 1967
Park Place Methodist Episcopal Church South (1910), 508 Olive Street, San Diego, California
three original buildings of Phoenix Union High School (1911–12), 512 E. Van Buren Phoenix, Arizona, NRHP-listed
Monroe School (1914), 215 N. 7th St. Phoenix, Arizona, NRHP-listed
Fourth Avenue Junior High School (1920), 450 S. 4th Ave. Yuma, Arizona (with V. Wallingford), NRHP-listed
Friendship Baptist Church (1925), 80 W. Dayton St. Pasadena, California, NRHP-listed
Second Baptist Church (1926), 1100 E. 24th St. Los Angeles, California, (with Paul R. Williams), NRHP-listed
Parkhurst Building (1927), Santa Monica, California, (principally by Herbert Powell), NRHP-listed
First Presbyterian Church (1927), 402 W. Monroe St. Phoenix, AZ, NRHP-listed
Roosevelt School, 201 6th St. Yuma, Arizona, NRHP-listed
Whittier High School
Nazarene College, Pasadena, CA
Ventura High School
the Women's Improvement Association building in South Pasadena
buildings for the campus of University of Redlands
Hollywood High School Historic District, 1521 N. Highland Ave., Los Angeles, CA (Marsh, Smith, & Powell)

References

1871 births
1955 deaths
American architects
University of Illinois alumni